Hopedale is the name of several places:

In Canada:
Hopedale, Newfoundland and Labrador

In the United Kingdom:
Hopedale, a hamlet within the parish of Alstonefield, Staffordshire

In the United States:
Hopedale, Illinois
Hopedale, Massachusetts, a New England town
Hopedale (CDP), Massachusetts, the town center
The Hopedale Community, historic community
Hopedale, Ohio